Felician University is a private Catholic university with two campuses in New Jersey, one in Lodi and one in Rutherford. It was founded as the Immaculate Conception Normal School by the Felician Sisters in 1923 and the school has changed names several times in its history, most recently in 2015 to Felician University. In 2016-17 enrollment was 1,996, with undergraduates comprising around 1,626 students. 21 percent are men, and 79 percent are women.

Campuses
Located  from New York City, Felician University has two locations in Bergen County, New Jersey, in the towns of Lodi and Rutherford. The Rutherford campus also has a gymnasium and a late-night coffee shop and game room.

Facilities
 John J. Breslin Theatre
 Library – The Lodi campus library occupies an International Style building and houses print collections, sound recordings, and visual media in digital format. Three levels contain an information commons, reading room, book stacks, spaces for group as well as quiet study, and two computer laboratories. Its more than 115,000 books, 360 print periodicals, 20,000 online journals, 43,000 electronic books, and 80,000 microforms offer strong historical and current perspectives in support of the curriculum. The library also provides a broad selection of online resources, of which are accessible on the campus computer network, as well as off-campus with a college network ID and password. The Curriculum Materials Library and Technology Center, located in Sammartino Hall on the Rutherford campus, collects children's literature, textbooks, curriculum guides, periodicals, and other instructional materials suitable for use in the classroom. An active information literacy instruction program through library liaisons begins with the Freshmen Year Experience program.

Accreditation
The university is accredited by the Middle States Commission on Higher Education. Specialized accreditation also exists for the nursing and teaching programs:
 Commission on Collegiate Nursing Education:
 Nursing (CNURED) – nursing education programs at the baccalaureate degree levels	4/28/1998
 Nursing (CNURED) – nursing education programs at the graduate degree levels	4/28/1998
 Teacher Education Accreditation Council, Accreditation Committee
 Baccalaureate Teacher Education Accreditation Council (BTEAC) – baccalaureate programs 6/29/2007 – pre-accredited
 Graduate Teacher Education Accreditation Council (GTEAC) – graduate programs	6/29/2007 – pre-accredited

2015 AAUP censure 
In June 2015, the American Association of University Professors (AAUP) censured Felician College for terminating the services of several faculty members without adequate explanation, adequate notice, or an opportunity for review.  The AAUP Investigating Committee also noted that "the fear of faculty members to communicate with [it] or to be seen by the administration as dissenters was palpable."

Athletics

Felician University teams participate as a member of the National Collegiate Athletic Association's Division II. The Golden Falcons are a member of the Central Atlantic Collegiate Conference (CACC). Men's sports include baseball, basketball, cross country, golf and soccer, and lacrosse. Women's sports include bowling, basketball, cross country, lacrosse, soccer, softball, volleyball, and track & field.

The women's cross country team earned the institution's first women's conference championship by winning the 2022 CACC title.

Notable alumni
 Jerry Vasto (born 1992), MLB pitcher for the Colorado Rockies

References

External links

Official athletics website

 – Lodi campus
 – Rutherford campus

 
Franciscan universities and colleges
Catholic universities and colleges in New Jersey
Universities and colleges in Bergen County, New Jersey
Lodi, New Jersey
Rutherford, New Jersey
Association of Catholic Colleges and Universities
Former women's universities and colleges in the United States
USCAA member institutions
1942 establishments in New Jersey
Educational institutions established in 1942
Romanesque Revival architecture in New Jersey